Antaeotricha arachnia is a moth of the family Depressariidae. It is found in Guyana.

The wingspan is about 24 mm. The forewings are white, all veins marked with streaks of fuscous suffusion and with dark fuscous dots on the termen between the veins. The hindwings are whitish.

References

Moths described in 1915
arachnia
Taxa named by Edward Meyrick
Moths of South America